Rear Admiral Gurcharan Singh, NM is a serving Flag officer in the Indian Navy. He currently serves as the Flag Officer Commanding Eastern Fleet, having taken over from Rear Admiral Sanjay Bhalla in November 2022.

Early life and education 
Singh was born in a naval family. His father was a gunnery officer and was posted at INS Venduruthy and subsequently at the gunnery school INS Dronacharya. Singh spent his childhood in Kochi and attended the Kendriya Vidyalaya Naval Base Kochi. After his schooling, he joined the National Defence Academy, Pune.

Singh has attended the Defence Services Staff College, Wellington, the Naval War College, Goa and the National Defence College.

Naval career 
Singh was commissioned into the Indian Navy on 1 July 1990. He is a specialist in Gunnery and missile Warfare. During his ab-initio training, he placed first in the overall order of merit and was awarded the Admiral RD Katari Trophy. He was the commissioning executive officer of the lead ship of her class of stealth guided missile frigate .

Singh has commanded the Veer-class missile vessel , and the lead ship of her class of missile corvettes . He subsequently commanded the Kolkata-class stealth guided-missile destroyer .

Singh, in his staff appointments, has served as the training coordinator at the gunnery base INS Dronacharya. He also served as the Director of Naval Intelligence at Naval headquarters. As a Commodore, he served as the Chief Staff Officer and Commodore Work Up at Indian Naval Workup Team Kochi (INWT), under the Flag Officer Sea Training (FOST). For his tenure at INWT, on 26 January 2020, he was awarded the Nao Sena Medal for devotion to duty. He subsequently served as the Deputy Commandant of his alma mater, Naval War College, Goa.

Flag rank
On promotion to Flag Rank, Singh took over as the Chief Staff Officer (Operations) (CSO Ops) at the Western Naval Command. He also served as the Assistant Chief of Personnel (Human Resource Development) (ACOP HRD) at naval headquarters. ACOP is an assistant principal staff officer appointment. On 29 November 2022, he assumed the office of the Flag Officer Commanding Eastern Fleet (FOCEF), taking over from Rear Admiral Sanjay Bhalla.

Awards and decorations

See also
 Flag Officer Commanding Eastern Fleet
 Eastern Fleet

References

Indian Navy admirals
Flag Officers Commanding Eastern Fleet
National Defence Academy (India) alumni
National Defence College, India alumni
Living people
Year of birth missing (living people)
Naval War College, Goa alumni
Defence Services Staff College alumni